Nipponotusukuru is a genus of Asian dwarf spiders that was first described by H. Saito & H. Ono in 2001.

Species
 it contains two species:
Nipponotusukuru enzanensis Saito & Ono, 2001 (type) – Japan
Nipponotusukuru spiniger Saito & Ono, 2001 – Japan

See also
 List of Linyphiidae species (I–P)

References

Araneomorphae genera
Linyphiidae
Spiders of Asia